Waiuku is a rural town in the Auckland Region in the North Island of New Zealand. It is located at the southern end of the Waiuku River, which is an estuarial arm of the Manukau Harbour, and lies on the isthmus of the Āwhitu Peninsula, which extends to the northeast. It is 40 kilometres southwest of Auckland city centre, and 12 kilometres north of the mouth of the Waikato River.

The town serves to support local farming, and is the residence of many employees of New Zealand Steel at Glenbrook, which is four kilometres to the northeast.

It was part of the Franklin District prior to it being abolished in 2010.  Most of the town is now within the boundaries of Auckland Council, with the balance in the area of Waikato District Council.

History and culture

Māori history

The Māori name Waiuku comes from a legend that two prominent brothers, Tamakae and Tamakou, vied for the hand of a beautiful high-ranking Waikato chieftainess. Tamakae was the cultivator, provider and Tamakou the orator. Tamakou was the first to meet her, but she requested that Tamakae be presented to her. He was working in the kumara gardens and had to be washed in the wai (water) and uku (a particular type of mud) at the stream that flows into the Manukau Harbour just behind the Waiuku Museum, before he was able to meet her. Tamakae won her heart and married her. From then the place was named Waiuku.

Waiuku was the site of an important portage called Te Pai o Kaiwaka, between the Manukau Harbour and the Waikato River (via the Awaroa Creek), avoiding the dangerous sandbar at the Manukau Heads. Hongi Hika took this path during the Musket Wars in the 1820s, when leading Ngāpuhi taua into the Waikato.

The local iwi and mana whenua are Ngāti Te Ata, a Waiohua iwi formed by the marriage of Te Atairehia of Te Waiohua, and Tapaue, a Tainui warrior, who settled in the Waiuku area in approximately the 1700s. In the 18th and 19th centuries, the Āwhitu Peninsula and southern Manukau Harbour were settled by Ngāti Te Ata and Ngāti Tamaoho, a separate Waiohua iwi. The coast alongside the Tasman Sea was settled by Ngāti Kahukōkā. In the late 1830s and early 1840s, Ngāti Tamaoho chief Ēpiha Pūtini envisioned the Waiuku area as a planned European settlement with regular streets and wooden houses, facilitating trade between the Manukau Harbour and the Waikato River.

European history

Waiuku came into existence as a port in about 1843, on the then important trade route between Auckland and the agricultural area of the Waikato. It was also the terminal of an ancient Maori portage between the Waikato River and the Manukau Harbour. Waiuku was marked out by the Government as a town in 1851. During the Waikato War (1863–64), Waiuku became a frontier stockade guarded by a blockhouse.

One of the founders of St Andrew's Presbyterian Church in Waiuku in the 19th century was Captain Sir John Makgill. Makgill arrived with his family in Waiuku in 1882 and established a farm called 'Brackmont' at Taurangaruru. He eventually increased his holdings there to about 2500 acres, and also bought land at Orua Bay. Sir John Makgill died at Brackmont on 14 November 1906. His wife was Margaret Isabella Haldane, sister of Lord Haldane, and their eldest son was George Makgill who spent most of his adult life in Scotland, becoming 11th Baronet of Makgill on his father's death. One other son John E Makgill continued to farm at Taurangaruru, while another Robert Haldane Makgill was a key figure in the development of New Zealand's public health system. He was one of the country's first district health officers, at a time when central government took on greater responsibility for public health. He was to play an important role during the 1918 influenza pandemic and its aftermath, notably as 'the chief architect' of 'the most useful legacy of the 1918 influenza pandemic': the 1920 Health Act.

The Waikato War ended the traffic responsible for the early development of the town as a trading post. Between 1870 and 1900, Waiuku, Karaka and the Āwhitu Peninsula were major centres for the kauri gum industry. Waiuku later grew as a farming centre under road board administration, and in 1914 became a town district. It was constituted a borough in 1955, and subsequently amalgamated into the Franklin District Council in 1988.

Modern history

A major development for the town was the government sponsored establishment, from the mid-1960s, of New Zealand's first steel plant at Glenbrook to convert ironsand brought from the black sand deposits at Waikato Heads into steel. After many changes of ownership and name, the company has returned to being called New Zealand Steel and is a division of BlueScope of Australia. The company continues to be a major employer in and influence on the town.

Marae

Waiuku has two marae affiliated with the Waikato Tainui hapū of Te Ākitai, Ngāti Paretaua and Ngāti Te Ata: Reretēwhioi Marae and its Arohanui meeting house, and Tāhuna Marae and its Teuwira meeting house.

Demographics

Waiuku had a population of 9,168 at the 2018 New Zealand census, an increase of 846 people (10.2%) since the 2013 census, and an increase of 1,710 people (22.9%) since the 2006 census. There were 3,261 households, comprising 4,557 males and 4,611 females, giving a sex ratio of 0.99 males per female, with 1,974 people (21.5%) aged under 15 years, 1,647 (18.0%) aged 15 to 29, 4,080 (44.5%) aged 30 to 64, and 1,467 (16.0%) aged 65 or older.

Ethnicities were 83.0% European/Pākehā, 19.9% Māori, 4.5% Pacific peoples, 6.4% Asian, and 1.8% other ethnicities. People may identify with more than one ethnicity.

The percentage of people born overseas was 21.4, compared with 27.1% nationally.

Although some people chose not to answer the census's question about religious affiliation, 56.2% had no religion, 31.0% were Christian, 1.0% had Māori religious beliefs, 1.5% were Hindu, 0.5% were Muslim, 0.3% were Buddhist and 2.2% had other religions.

Of those at least 15 years old, 1,008 (14.0%) people had a bachelor's or higher degree, and 1,506 (20.9%) people had no formal qualifications. 1,383 people (19.2%) earned over $70,000 compared to 17.2% nationally. The employment status of those at least 15 was that 3,579 (49.7%) people were employed full-time, 939 (13.1%) were part-time, and 297 (4.1%) were unemployed.

Local government 

Waiuku has a local government just like other suburbs of Auckland at that time. The local government was called Waiuku Borough Council, which started in 1955 and merged into Franklin District Council in 1989, eventually amalgamated into Auckland Council in November 2010.

Waiuku Borough had two mayors:
1955–1971 R. S. Whiteside
1971–1989 S. K. Lawrence

Attractions

The local pub, called The Kentish Hotel, is New Zealand's longest continuously licensed hotel. It was built by one of the first European settlers in Waiuku, Edward Constable, as an inn in 1851. His presence can still be felt in the name of the pub (he was from Kent), and the street behind it - Constable Road. The Kentish, with its ornate verandahs, provides a historical centre point to the town and the nearby Tamakae Reserve.

At the entrance to the Reserve stands a statue of Tamakae carved from swamp kauri logs. The logs were found during some excavation work at New Zealand Steel and gifted to the local iwi (tribe), Ngati Te Ata. The Reserve also has a small historic "village" with several restored buildings including Hartmann House, dating back to 1886, now operating as a local craft studio, Pollock Cottage (1890), Waiuku Jail (1865) and The Creamery (1890s). The nearby Waiuku Museum has colonial era memorabilia, Māori artifacts, old sailing boats and historic photographs. A heritage trail around town points out further sites of historic interest in Waiuku including Wesley Methodist Church (1883), from where visitors to the town can get a panoramic view across Waiuku and the waterfront reserve.

Waiuku Museum, a museum on local history, opened in 1965.

Glenbrook Vintage Railway is a heritage railway opened in 1977.

The West Coast black sand beach, Karioitahi, is located nearby.

Waiuku has a pistol club with a ranges, and one of New Zealand's largest airsoft clubs.

Education

All these schools are coeducational. Rolls are as of

Notable people 

Notable people from Waiuku include:
 David Aspin, Olympic wrestler
 Zinzan Brooke, rugby player
 Stephen Donald, rugby player
 Ross Ihaka, statistics professor
 Elsie Locke, peace activist and historian
 John Campbell Paterson, Bishop of Auckland from 1994 to 2010
 Kevin Skinner, rugby player
 Pat Walsh, rugby player

References

External links
Waiukufamilies.org.nz - General information about Waiuku
Historic West
Pictures of waiuku
Realtime Waiuku weather
Waiuku attractions
New Zealand Historic Places Trust

Populated places in the Auckland Region
Populated places around the Manukau Harbour
Kauri gum